Mon Repos or Monrepos (French for "my place of rest") may refer to:

Places
 Mon Repos, Queensland, Australia
 Mon Repos Conservation Park, a turtle rookery at Mon Repos
 Mon Repos, Saint Lucia, a village on the island of Saint Lucia
 Mon Repos, Port of Spain, a community in the ward Laventille, Port of Spain, Trinidad and Tobago 
 Mon Repos, a suburb of San Fernando, Trinidad and Tobago

Parks 
 Monrepos Park, a landscape garden in Vyborg, Russia
 Parc de Mon Repos, a park in Lausanne, Switzerland

Buildings 
 Mon Repos, Corfu, a villa and former royal estate on the island of Corfu 
 Monrepos Palace, a water pavilion in Ludwigsburg, Germany
 Monrepos (archaeology), an archaeological research centre and museum in Germany